Chester Ray Longwell (15 October 1887 – 15 December 1975) was an American geologist who conducted extensive research into the geology of the Basin and Range province in Nevada. His fieldwork led to a more complete understanding of Paleozoic and lower Mesozoic stratigraphic sequence in the southern Great Basin.

Elected a Fellow of the Geological Society of America in 1923, Longwell served as society's president in 1949. He was elected a member of the National Academy of Sciences in 1935. From 1953 to 1954, he served as president, American Geological Institute. He was elected to the American Philosophical Society in 1948 and the American Academy of Arts and Sciences in 1953.

Chester Ray Longwell was born on 15 October 1887 near Spalding, Missouri. He earned his bachelor's degree at University of Missouri and his Ph.D. at Yale. He taught at Yale from 1920 to 1956. He died at his home in Palo Alto, California on 15 December 1975.

Selected publictations

References

1887 births
1975 deaths
20th-century American geologists
University of Missouri alumni
Yale University alumni
Yale University faculty
Fellows of the Geological Society of America

Members of the American Philosophical Society